"Ke Star" is a single by South African rapper Focalistic. It was released by 18 Area Holdings on April  25, 2020 as lead single  from his Extended Play  Blecke (2020). It was written by Focalistic and produced by Vigro Deep.

An accompanying music video for the song, directed by Steezus, was released in September 2020. 
"Ke Star" was certified gold in South Africa and was nominated for Best Amapiano Song, at the 6th Mzansi Kwaito and House Music Awards.

Commercial performance 
"Ke Star" remix debuted number 1 on iTunes and Apple Music Top songs charts for 2 consecutive weeks in Nigeria. In the US debuted  number 16 on  Billboard  Top Thriller  Charts.

Accolades 
"Ke Star" was nominated  for Amapiano  Song Of the Year and Best Amapiano Music Video at the 1st ceremony of South African Amapiano Music Awards in 2021.

! 
|-
|rowspan="3"|2021
| rowspan="3"|"Ke Star"
| Amapiano  Song Of the Year
| 
| rowspan="2"|
|-
| Best Amapiano Music Video
| 
|-
| Best Amapiano Song
|
|

Remix 

"Ke Star" remix by South African rapper Focalistic and Nigerian-American singer Davido featuring South African producer Virgo Deep. It was released on February 19, 2021 by 18 Area Holdings.

The song debuted number 16 on  Billboard Top Triller Global chart in the U.S.

Track listing
Digital download
"Ke Star" (Blecke EP Version) – 4:51

Digital download (Davido)
"Black and Yellow" (Davido and Focalistic) (featuring featuring Virgo Deep) – 5:28

Certifications and sales

References  

2020 songs
2020 singles